XVII Corps is the first mountain strike corps of India which has been built as a quick reaction force and as well as counter offensive force against China along LAC. Its headquarters are located at Panagarh in West Bengal under Eastern Command. It is also known as Brahmastra Corps.

History 
Republic of India shares a boundary (LAC) of length 4,057 km with Tibet autonomous region. The two countries still have not resolved their disagreement about where exactly the border lies; specially over two regions – Aksai Chin and Arunachal Pradesh. Intrusion of troops of PLA into Indian territory, construction of watch tower close to the mutually-accepted "border patrolling line" near Burtse, "standardization" of the names of six towns in Arunachal Pradesh (China claims that Arunachal Pradesh is integral part of China) enhanced the tension.

In addition, China has developed a rail network and five fully operational airbases in Tibet Autonomous Region. Key airfields include those at Hoping, Pangta and Kong Ka. In Tibet and Yunan, roads are extended over 58,000 km (in 2010) up to the border, at an approximate cost of about $325 billion. As a result of all these buildout of infrastructures, China can mobilize 30 divisions (each with over 15,000 soldiers) aside heading to the LAC within 48 hours. Moreover, about 300,011 PLA troops and six Rapid Reaction Forces are placed at Chengdu.

To reinforce defensive power across the border in Arunachal Pradesh, the Indian Army raised two new infantry divisions (1,260 officers and 35,000 soldiers) at Likapani and Missamari (Assam) in 2009-2010. However PLA outnumbered Indian army near border by three to one.

To overcome the gap, in July 2013, the cabinet committee, under the UPA government, sanctioned the proposal, which had been already approved by Chiefs of Staff Committee or CoSC, a committee composed of the chiefs of Indian Army, Indian Navy and Indian Air Force, to build the new mountain strike corps over a time span of seven years (12th plan period (2012–17), with a little spillover into the 13th plan if necessary). The corps was planned to be raised with around  90 thousand soldiers and thus Rs 64,678 crore had been sanctioned. Out of this budget, around Rs 39,000 crore had been earmarked for capital expenditure. An additional Rs 19,000 crore was also demanded for further development.

From October 2013, the army started posting key officers in Ranchi, Jharkhand. On January 1, 2014, Major General Raymond Joseph Noronha, the first commander of 17 Corps, raised the flag of this corps for the first time in Ranchi. The corps was relocated from Ranchi to Panagarh in 2019.

Strength 
The initial plan at the time of raising was to have the corps with two infantry divisions, two independent armoured brigades and artillery, engineer, air defence and aviation brigades. Because of budgetary constraints, the raising was halted in 2018, leaving a truncated force comprising the Corps HQ, one infantry division and specific other combat and combat support elements.

The Corps consists of - 
23 Infantry Division - The division has been moved from I Corps to XVII Corps. As I Corps moved to Northern Command, the division is situated at Ranchi.

59 Infantry Division -  has already been established at Panagarh. It consists of six Brigades, of which three are Infantry and one each of Engineers, Air Defence and Artillery.

72 Division was planned to be established at Darjeeling.

Mascot
The corps mascot is the Snow leopard, signifying strength, resolve and bravery - traits associated with the predator, with which it shares its geographical habitat.

Exercise

List of General Officers Commanding

Notes

References

External links 

 

Corps of India